Garamkhani (also Romanized as Garamkhānī; also known as Garamkhākhī and Karamkhānī) is a village in Masal Rural District, in the Central District of Masal County, Gilan Province, Iran. At the 2006 census, its population was 63, in 15 families.

References 

Populated places in Masal County